Trombidium cancelai is a species of mite in the genus Trombidium in the family Trombidiidae. It is found in Spain.

References
 Synopsis of the described Arachnida of the World: Trombidiidae

Further reading
  (1967): Contribution à l'étude des Acariens Thrombidiidae d'Europe. Memoires de Museum Nationale d’Histoire Naturelle

Trombidiidae
Arachnids of Europe
Animals described in 1967